Veronika Zvařičová (born December 8, 1988 in Krnov) is a retired Czech biathlete.

Career
Zvařičová competed in the 2010 Winter Olympics for the Czech Republic. She finished 71st in the sprint.

As of February 2013, her best performance at the Biathlon World Championships is 10th, as part of the Czech women's relay team, in 2012. Her best individual result at the Biathlon World Championships is 22nd, in the 2009 sprint.

As of February 2013, Zvařičová has won one Biathlon World Cup medal, a bronze with the Czech women's relay team at Ruhpolding in 2012/13. Her best individual performance in a Biathlon World Cup event is 34th, in the sprint at Östersund in 2012/13. Her best overall finish in the Biathlon World Cup is 79th, in 2008/09.

World Cup podiums

References 

1988 births
Biathletes at the 2010 Winter Olympics
Czech female biathletes
Living people
Olympic biathletes of the Czech Republic
People from Krnov
Sportspeople from the Moravian-Silesian Region